John Cradock Maples, Baron Maples (22 April 1943 – 9 June 2012) was a British politician and life peer who served as Economic Secretary to the Treasury from 1989 to 1992. A member of the Conservative Party, he was Member of Parliament (MP) for Lewisham West from 1983 to 1992 and Stratford-upon-Avon from 1997 to 2010.

Early life
John Cradock Maples was born at Fareham, Hampshire. His father, a businessman, lived in the Wirral; he was educated at Marlborough College, before going up to Downing College, Cambridge, where he read Law, and played hockey for the college and performed with the Footlights. Maples received an MA in 1964, and later studied at the Harvard Business School. He was called to the Bar at the Inner Temple in 1965.

In the 1960s, Maples founded the Cayman Islands law firm of Maples and Calder with James MacDonald and Douglas Calder.

Parliamentary career

1983–1992: MP for Lewisham West 
Maples was the MP for Lewisham West from 1983, until he lost the seat at the 1992 general election. His business background attracted him to the Treasury benches: Margaret Thatcher appointed him Parliamentary Private Secretary to Norman Lamont, then Economic Secretary to the Treasury. On Nigel Lawson's resignation in 1989, Lamont was made Chief Secretary to the Treasury, with Maples moving up to take Lamont's former role. During his time as Economic Secretary from 1989 to 1990, Maples was instrumental in working with David Cameron on the policy to enter the Exchange Rate Mechanism, with the pound sterling pegged designed to track the German deutschmark. In 1990, Maples had been appointed as Economic Secretary before the change of Prime Ministers. He dealt with the BCCI (Bank of Credit and Commerce International) case. The Arab bank was based in London, and fell prey to the subsequent Arms to Iraq scandals and collapsed, bankrupting its depositors. He was also responsible for monitoring the Bank of England's monetary policy, which included bank regulation.

At the 1992 general election he lost the Lewisham seat to Labour. He returned to the House of Commons at the following general election, in 1997; in the interim he was Chairman of Saatchi and Saatchi, the advertising and lobbying group, which had supported Thatcher.

1997–2010: MP for Stratford-on-Avon 
In 1995, after Stratford-upon-Avon MP Alan Howarth defected to Labour, Maples won the selection battle to replace him as Conservative candidate for the constituency, defeating local resident Maureen Hicks, former MP for Wolverhampton North East, who had likewise lost her seat in 1992. Maples went on to be elected for the seat, which was one of the Conservatives' safest, in 1997. He was re-elected in both the 2001 and 2005 general elections.

Maples was a member of William Hague's shadow cabinet from 1997 to 2000, holding the Health, Defence and Foreign Policy briefs in succession. While Shadow Foreign Secretary, he was caught apparently calling for Britain to help Vladimir Putin in the Second Chechen War, by saying that "because there is nothing we can do about it anyway."

In the reshuffle prompted by the return of Michael Portillo to the front bench, he lost his job to Francis Maude and left the shadow cabinet. Maples had been widely believed to be one of the main "plotters" behind the downfall of then Conservative party leader Iain Duncan Smith.

He returned to front bench politics in a minor reshuffle in November 2006, when David Cameron appointed him Deputy Chairman of the Conservative Party with responsibility for candidate selection. He replaced ex-shadow cabinet minister Bernard Jenkin. Because of Cameron's high-profile attempts to have more female and minority candidates selected, which met with some opposition from local parties, the post was seen as an important one. Maples was a Cameron loyalist, and elevated to the House of Lords in July 2010. While an MP, Maples was president of the Conservative Friends of Israel.

In the 2009 MP's expenses scandal it emerged that Maples had claimed the Royal Automobile Club as his principal residence though according to his obituary he immediately denied any wrongdoing.
On 10 January 2010, Maples announced that he would stand down from the House of Commons at the general election which was held that May.

2010–2012: Life peer 
On 24 July 2010, in the Dissolution Honours List, Maples was created a Life Peer as Baron Maples, of Stratford-upon-Avon in the County of Warwickshire.

During a Lords debate on voting reform in November 2010, Lord Maples compared Lewisham West unfavourably with his other former constituency, Stratford-upon-Avon, stating that they "could not be more different". He claimed that Lewisham West was "three square miles of concrete", did not have an "identity", and that many of its constituents "did not know which borough they lived in". He added that Stratford-upon-Avon had a "very articulate" electorate and Lewisham West had "immigration and housing problems". Lord Maples was working on the Financial Services Bill from the joint Parliamentary Finance Committee.

Personal life
Maples married designer Lawry Kennedy (1946–1982), who was one of the first people to renovate early 1900s brick townhouses to help gentrify abandoned and rundown areas in Boston in the United States and London in England.  They married on the Rhode Island oceanfront in July 1976; she divorced him in July 1980. He married journalist Jane Corbin in December 1986 in Westminster. The couple had a son and a daughter.

Maples died in Westminster, London, on 9 June 2012 from cancer, aged 69; his death was announced in the Lords by Baroness D'Souza.

References

External links
 Guardian Unlimited Politics – Ask Aristotle: John Maples MP
 TheyWorkForYou.com – John Maples MP
 
 Interview on On The Record in December 1999
 BBC Politics page

News items
 Speech at 1999 Conservative conference
 Answering questions on BBC News Online in July 1999

|-

|-

|-

|-

|-

1943 births
2012 deaths
Alumni of Downing College, Cambridge
Deaths from cancer in England
Conservative Party (UK) life peers
Life peers created by Elizabeth II
Conservative Party (UK) MPs for English constituencies
English barristers
Harvard Business School alumni
Members of the Inner Temple
People educated at Marlborough College
People from Fareham
UK MPs 1983–1987
UK MPs 1987–1992
UK MPs 1997–2001
UK MPs 2001–2005
UK MPs 2005–2010